A diagram is a symbolic representation of information using visualization techniques.

Diagram or Diagrams may also refer to:
Diagram (category theory), categorical analogue of an indexed family in set theory
Diagram (mathematical logic), proving useful properties of a theory
Diagrams (band), British rock band
Ophite Diagrams, esoteric ritual diagrams used by the Ophite sect of Gnosticism

See also
The Diagram Brothers